Andrei Karpach (born 6 June 1994) is a Belarusian freestyle wrestler. In 2018, he won one of the bronze medals in the 74 kg event at the 2018 European Wrestling Championships held in Kaspiysk, Russia.

Major results

References

External links 
 

Living people
1994 births
Place of birth missing (living people)
Belarusian male sport wrestlers
European Wrestling Championships medalists
20th-century Belarusian people
21st-century Belarusian people